Religious Jews are Jews who practice and observe Judaism. They may be affiliated with:

 Conservative Judaism
 Orthodox Judaism, including Religious Zionists in Israel
 Haredi Judaism (ultra-Orthodox Judaism)
 Modern Orthodox Judaism
 Reconstructionist Judaism
 Reform Judaism

See also
 Jewish Renewal